Cychrus kozlovi is a species of ground beetle in the subfamily of Carabinae. It was described by Semenov and Znojko in 1934.

References

kozlovi
Beetles described in 1934